Alice E. Smith is an American industrial engineer whose research concerns mathematical optimization for complex applications in manufacturing, business planning, advanced materials, and communication networks, based on problems including facility location and network design. She is Joe W. Forehand/Accenture Professor of Industrial and Systems Engineering at Auburn University, where she also holds an adjunct appointment in the Department of Computer Science and Software Engineering.

Education and career
Smith is a 1979 graduate of Rice University, where she majored in civil engineering. Following this, she worked for Southwestern Bell Corporation as an engineer and engineering manager for ten years, from 1979 to 1989. In this time, she also  earned an MBA at Saint Louis University in 1988.

Returning to graduate study in engineering, she completed a PhD in 1991 at the Missouri University of Science and Technology, focusing on engineering management and systems engineering. She became an assistant professor of industrial engineering at the University of Pittsburgh in 1991, and associate professor there in 1996, before moving to Auburn University in 1999 as full professor and chair of the Department of Industrial and Systems Engineering. She was named Philpott—WestPoint Stevens Professor in 2001, W. Allen and Martha Reed Professor in 2012, and Joe W. Forehand/Accenture Distinguished Professor in 2015.

Recognition
Smith was named a Fellow of the Institute of Industrial and Systems Engineers in 2003. She is a Fellow of the Institute for Operations Research and the Management Sciences, elected in the 2021 class of fellows.

Smith was the 2009 winner of the WORMS Award for the Advancement of Women in Operations Research and Management Science.
In 2012, the Institute of Industrial and Systems Engineers gave Smith their Albert G. Holzman Distinguished Educator Award. She won the Wellington Award of the Engineering Economy Division of the Institute of Industrial and Systems Engineers, for her lifetime achievements in the field.

References

External links
Home page

Conversations on Gender Equality: Alice E. Smith, Springer Nature

Year of birth missing (living people)
Living people
American industrial engineers
American women engineers
Rice University alumni
Saint Louis University alumni
Missouri University of Science and Technology alumni
University of Pittsburgh faculty
Auburn University faculty
Fellows of the Institute for Operations Research and the Management Sciences